Funeral Mist is a Swedish black metal band formed in Stockholm in 1993. To date, the band have released four full-length albums, three EPs and a compilation boxset. Since 2003, the band's sole permanent member has been Arioch, also known for his work as the frontman of the black metal band Marduk.

History
The band in its original form was founded in autumn of 1993 by now former members. Bass player Arioch was added in the summer of 1994.

In summer 1995, Funeral Mist's first demo titled Darkness was recorded but was released in early 1996. The second demo Havoc followed was recorded in summer/autumn 1996, with only Arioch being left of the old line-up, and new drummer Necromorbus (Tore Stjerna). In late 1997, they recorded the debut EP Devilry which was released in summer 1998 in both CD and vinyl format. The vinyl edition was limited to only 300 copies and featured an exclusive track, "Hellspell 2". This track was later included on the 2005 re-release which also includes the Havoc recordings.

Their first full-length album, Salvation, was released on the Norma Evangelium Diaboli label in 2003, while the second album, titled Maranatha, was released in February 2009 on the same label, after 6 years of silence.

In September 2012, Season of Mist re-released Devilry and Salvation. In 2017, Devilry, Salvation, and Maranatha were reissued on vinyl through Norma Evangelium Diaboli.

In December 2nd, 2013 and to coincide with the band's 20th anniversary Norma Evangelium Diaboli released the vinyl boxset Trisagion which included all of the band's discography at that point.

In August 27th, 2015 during Beyond the Gates IV on Bergen, Arioch performed the song "The God Supreme" live for the first time alongside Icelandic black metal band Misþyrming, this was reportedly the only time Arioch will ever perform Funeral Mist material live.

Funeral Mist released their third full-length, Hekatomb, on June 15, 2018, again under the Norma Evangelium Diaboli label.
 
In January 2020, Norma Evangelium Diaboli released the 4-tape boxset In Manus Tuas - The Cassette Collection.

The fourth Funeral Mist full-length Deiform was released on December 17th 2021 through Norma Evangelium Diaboli.

Musical style and ideology 
Funeral Mist plays a black metal style characterised by Norma Evangelium Diaboli as violent, chaotic and "musically bizarre", to which Arioch added "complex layers of ill sounds" on Maranatha. The lyrics deal with devil worship and blasphemy, often using (sometimes slightly changed) quotes from the King James Version of the Bible for the latter. Arioch points out that "a band that claims to play Black Metal must always have Satanism and nothing but Satanism as the highest priority in their music and concept as well as in their personal lives" and that neither the voice, nor the sound and musical style make a black metal band.

Members

Current line up
 Arioch (aka Mortuus) - bass (1994 - present), vocals, guitars (1996 - present)

Session musicians
 Lars Broddesson (aka Lars B.) - drums (2008 - present)

Past members
 Typhos (Henrik Ekeroth)  - guitars, vocals (1993 - 1995)
 Vintras  - guitars (1993 - 1995)
 Velion - drums (1993 - 1995)
 Nachash - guitars (1996 - 2003)
 Necromorbus (Tore Stjerna) - drums (1996 - 2003)

Discography

Studio albums 
 2003 - Salvation
 2009 - Maranatha
 2018 - Hekatomb
 2021 - Deiform

Demos 
 1995 - Promo '95 (demo)
 1995 - Darkness (demo)
 1996 - Havoc (demo)

Miscellaneous 
 1998 - Devilry (EP)
 2013 - Trisagion (compilation)
 2020 - In Manus Tuas - The Cassette Collection (compilation)

References

External links 
 Official homepage
 [ Allmusic discography entry]

Swedish black metal musical groups
Musical groups established in 1993
1993 establishments in Sweden